Matthew Carney is an Australian journalist and television producer for the Australian Broadcasting Corporation. He is the executive producer of Four Corners.

Carney joined the ABC in 1995. He worked as a reporter on Four Corners and later as the chief of the ABC's North Asia and China bureaus, holding the latter role between 2016 and 2018.

He became the executive producer of Foreign Correspondent in 2018. He was appointed as the executive producer of Four Corners in May 2022.

References

Living people
Australian television journalists
Year of birth missing (living people)